Oblivion Hunter is the first EP by the noise rock band Lightning Bolt. It was released in September 2012 by Load Records.

The record was advertised as an EP, although it has the length of some Lightning Bolt albums. The EP is a collection of unreleased material recorded in 2008.

Track listing

Personnel
Brian Chippendale – drums and vocals
Brian Gibson – bass guitar

References

External links
 Lightning Bolt official website
 Lightning Bolt at Load Records

2012 EPs
Lightning Bolt (band) albums
Load Records EPs